Wate longinus is a species of beetle in the family Carabidae, the only species in the genus Wate.

References

Ctenodactylinae